Todo por amor is a Mexican telenovela produced by Argos Comunicación for TV Azteca. It is based on the 1998 Colombian telenovela La madre, created by Mónica Tenorio Agudelo. It aired on Azteca Trece from 27 January 2000 to 12 January 2001. The series stars Angélica Aragón and Fernando Luján.

Premise 
Carmén Dávila has been married for 26 years to Enrique, and is the mother of five children, ranging in age from 10 to 24. Although Carmen apparently leads a happy family life, all is not what it seems. She will discover that a life dedicated to love and giving does not guarantee happiness. Carmen will struggle to raise her children, despite the dangers that loom over them, and in her task she will count on the help of Gonzalo, a kind widower who will mean for Carmen a new way of loving.

Cast

Main 
 Angélica Aragón as Carmen Dávila 
 Fernando Luján as Gonzalo Robles
 Plutarco Haza as Javier Villegas Torreblanca
 Ana de la Reguera as Lucía García Dávila
 Damián Alcázar as Mariano Ayala
 Roberto Sosa as Camilo 
 Cecilia Suárez as Carmina "Mina" García Dávila  
 Anna Ciocchetti as Regina Olazábal de la Colina
 Patricia Llaca as Raquel 
 Laura Luz as Graciela
 Claudia Lobo as Martha
 Lourdes Villarreal as Lola
 Joaquín Garrido as Andrés
 Ana Celia Urquidi as Esther
 Alejandro Calva as Álvaro
 Eduardo Arroyuelo as Sergio García Dávila
 Gian Piero Díaz as Francisco García Dávila
 Aléx Perea as Enrique "Quique" García Dávila
 Vanessa Ciangherotti as María Robles
 Manuel Blejerman as Emilio
 Mauricio Fernández as Miguel
 Álvaro Guerrero as Enrique García
 Fabián Corres as Manuel Iriarte
 Francisco de la O as Luis Madrazo
 Carmen Madrid as Marlene
 Elizabeth Guindi as Amalia
 Guillermo Ríos as Onésimo Ríos
 Carlos Torres Torrija as Suárez

Recurring and guest stars 
 Irene Azuela as Marisol
 Juan Carlos Barreto as Rubén
 Gabriel Porras as Alejandro
 Jorge Cáceres as Armando
 José María Yazpik as Mateo
 Margarita Gralia as Laura
 Carmen Beato as Mercedes "Meche"
 Luis Felipe Tovar as Adolfo Mancera

Production 
Production and filming of the series began on 29 November 1999, on location in Colonia Roma, Mexico City. The production had a total of 120 episodes planned for broadcast; however, Epigmenio Ibarra announced in September 2000 that the telenovela would be extended until January 2001, increasing the number of episodes originally planned. Todo por amor was the last telenovela of the first co-production agreement between Argos Comunicación and TV Azteca since 1994, ending the same day of its final episode.

Release

Broadcast 
The series premiered on Azteca Trece on 27 January 2000, from Monday to Friday at 9:00 p.m. replacing La vida en el espejo. From 1 to 2 February 2000, the series rebroadcast its first two episodes, respectively, and resumed broadcasting on 3 February 2000. The series ended on 12 January 2001 with 250 episodes, being replaced the following week by Amores, querer con alevosía.

References

External links 
 

2000 telenovelas
2000 Mexican television series debuts
2001 Mexican television series endings
Mexican telenovelas
TV Azteca telenovelas
Argos Comunicación telenovelas
Mexican television series based on Colombian television series
Spanish-language telenovelas